Bhagyavan is a 1993 Indian Malayalam-language drama film directed by Suresh Unnithan and written by C. Radhakrishnan, starring Sreenivasan and Sithara in lead roles.

Plot
Balagoplan "Balu" is a post-graduate, but unemployed. He is active in local youth club while waiting for a job. He spends his time with friends Mathachan, Rahulan, Mammu and Jose rehearsing a drama for temple festival. His fiancé Ammu and mother are worried about his irresponsible nature.

The movie progresses with Balu and friends getting into trouble when their experimental drama attempt Peruchazhikale Ningalkku Oru Aalayam (A house for rats) fails midway during the temple festival. Meanwhile, Rahulan becomes a good friend of Meena, daughter of affluent politician Karunan Muthalali.

The story takes a turn when the local astrologer, Mulankattu Gurukkal examines Balu's horoscope and identifies that his horoscope has a special property called "Alabhya Labhya Shree". This means that his presence will bring luck to people around him while he himself will never be able to enjoy the luck.

Balu starts up a rubber plantation with a loan from the bank. During the inauguration, a treasure pot full of golden coins and ornaments is found from his land. But as per law government officials take over the treasure. This incident spread the news of Balu's "Alabhya Labhya Shree". Unni Pillai insists Balu to buy a lottery ticket for him. Unni Pillai wins Rs. 50000 in lottery draw.

The rest of the movie is Balu's struggle to stay sane when people around him compete for his luck.

Cast

 Sreenivasan as Balu
 Sithara as Ammu
 Jagathy Sreekumar as Mathachan
 Premkumar as Jose	
 Sainudeen	as Mammu
 Jagadish
 Vijayaraghavan as Rahulan
 Suchithra as Meena
 Adoor Bhavani as Devaki, Balu's mother
 Beena Antony
 Narendra Prasad as Divakaran Thekkumthara MLA	
 Philomina as Ammu's mother
 Karamana Janardanan Nair as Mulankattu Gurukkal
 Mamukkoya as Unni Kurup
 Poojappura Radhakrishnan
 Oduvil Unnikrishnan as Vasudevan
 T. P. Madhavan as Watchman
 Kollam Thulasi

References

External links
 

1993 films
1990s Malayalam-language films